Dacian or Dacianus was the prefect of Gaul under Diocletian and Maximian and acted in Hispania Tarraconensis or Hispania Carthaginensis at about the same time. He caused the martyrdom of, amongst others, Saint Faith, Caprasius of Agen, Vincent of Saragossa and Eulalia of Barcelona.

See also
Roman Catholic Diocese of Agen

References

Romans from Hispania
4th-century Gallo-Roman people